An Evening with Belafonte/Makeba is a Grammy Award-winning 1965 album by Harry Belafonte and Miriam Makeba, released by RCA Victor. It was the second outcome of the long lasting collaboration between Belafonte and Makeba, the first being the appearance of Makeba in the song "One More Dance" on Belafonte's 1960 album, Belafonte Returns to Carnegie Hall.

Despite the title, the album is not a collection of live duet performances by Harry Belafonte and Makeba. It is a studio album of 12 tracks, five by Belafonte, five by Makeba, and two duets. The songs are all African traditional tunes sung in tribal languages like Xhosa and Zulu.

In the mid-1960s, Belafonte was very active in supporting emerging African artists as well as making African music known worldwide, and this album is an example of this activity. It includes classical African songs like Malaika (with the English title My Angel) as well as songs in African languages such as Zulu, Sotho and Swahili.

Track listing
 "Train Song" (Mbombela)– 3:08 (Harry + Miriam)
 "'In the Land of the Zulus" (Kwazulu) – 2:30 (sung by Miriam Makeba)
 "Hush, Hush" (Thula Thula) – 3:03 (sung by Harry Belafonte)
 "To Those We Love" (Nongqongqo)– 2:15 (sung by Miriam Makeba)
 "Give Us Our Land" – 2:27 (sung by Harry Belafonte)
 "Ndodemnyama Verwoerd!" – 2:05 (sung by Miriam Makeba)
 "Gone Are My Children" – 2:47 (sung by Harry Belafonte)
 "Hurry, Mama, Hurry!" – 3:25 (sung by Miriam Makeba)
 "My Angel" – 3:12 (Harry + Miriam)
 "Cannon" – 2:47 (sung by Miriam Makeba)
 "Lullaby" – 2:46 (sung by Harry Belafonte)
 "Show Me the Way, My Brother" – 3:10 (sung by Harry Belafonte)

Personnel
Harry Belafonte – vocals (1, 3, 5, 7, 9, 11, 12)
Miriam Makeba – vocals (1, 2, 4, 6, 8, 9, 10)
Sam Brown – guitar
Eddie Diehl – guitar
Marvin Falcon – guitar
Ernie Calabria – guitar
Jay Berliner – guitar
William Salter – bass
John Cartwright – bass
Auchee Lee – percussion
Solomon Ilori – percussion
Chief Bey – percussion
Ralph MacDonald – percussion
Percy Brice – percussion
Production
Andy Wiswell – producer
Conducted by Jonas Gwangwa and Howard Roberts
Arrangements by Jonas Gwangwa
Harry Belafonte – executive producer, liner notes
Bob Simpson – engineer

References

1965 albums
Harry Belafonte albums
Collaborative albums
Miriam Makeba albums
RCA Records albums
Albums conducted by Howard Roberts
Albums conducted by Jonas Gwangwa
Albums arranged by Jonas Gwangwa
Vocal duet albums